Proto-oncogene tyrosine-protein kinase Src, also known as proto-oncogene c-Src, or simply c-Src (cellular Src; pronounced "sarc", as it is short for sarcoma), is a non-receptor tyrosine kinase protein that in humans is encoded by the SRC gene. It belongs to a family of Src family kinases and is similar to the v-Src (viral Src) gene of Rous sarcoma virus. It includes an SH2 domain, an SH3 domain and a tyrosine kinase domain. Two transcript variants encoding the same protein have been found for this gene.

c-Src phosphorylates specific tyrosine residues in other tyrosine kinases. It plays a role in the regulation of embryonic development and cell growth. An elevated level of activity of c-Src is suggested to be linked to cancer progression by promoting other signals. Mutations in c-Src could be involved in the malignant progression of colon cancer. c-Src should not be confused with CSK (C-terminal Src kinase), an enzyme that phosphorylates c-Src at its C-terminus and provides negative regulation of Src's enzymatic activity.

c-Src was originally discovered by American scientists J. Michael Bishop and Harold E. Varmus, for which they were awarded the 1989 Nobel Prize in Physiology or Medicine.

Discovery 

In 1979, J. Michael Bishop and Harold E. Varmus discovered that normal chickens possess a gene that is structurally closely related to v-Src. The normal cellular gene was called c-src (cellular-src). This discovery changed the current thinking about cancer from a model wherein cancer is caused by a foreign substance (a viral gene) to one where a gene that is normally present in the cell can cause cancer. It is believed that at one point an ancestral virus mistakenly incorporated the c-Src gene of its cellular host. Eventually this normal gene mutated into an abnormally functioning oncogene within the Rous sarcoma virus. Once the oncogene is transfected back into a chicken, it can lead to cancer.

Structure 

There are 9 members part of the Src family kinases: c-Src, Yes, Fyn, Fgr, Yrk, Lyn, Blk, Hck, and Lck. The expression of these Src family members are not the same throughout all tissues and cell types. Src, Fyn and Yes are expressed ubiquitously in all cell types while the others are generally found in hematopoietic cells.

c-Src is made up of 6 functional regions: Src homology 4 domain (SH4 domain), unique region, SH3 domain, SH2 domain, catalytic domain and short regulatory tail. When Src is inactive, the phosphorylated tyrosine group at the 527 position interacts with the SH2 domain which helps the SH3 domain interact with the flexible linker domain and thereby keeps the inactive unit tightly bound. The activation of c-Src causes the dephosphorylation of the tyrosine 527. This induces long-range allostery via protein domain dynamics, causing the structure to be destabilized, resulting in the opening up of the SH3, SH2 and kinase domains and the autophosphorylation of the residue tyrosine 416.

The autophosphorylation of Y416 as well as phosphorylation of selected Src substrates is enhanced through dimerization of c-Src. The dimerization of c-Src is mediated by the interaction of the myristoylated N-terminal region of one partner and the kinase domain of another partner. Both the N-terminally attached myristic acid and the peptide sequences of the unique region are involved in the interaction. Given the versatility inherent in this intrinsically disordered region, its multisite phosphorylations, and its divergence within the family, the unique domain likely functions as a central signaling hub overseeing much of the enzymatic activities and unique functions of Src family kinases.

c-Src can be activated by many transmembrane proteins that include: adhesion receptors, receptor tyrosine kinases, G-protein coupled receptors and cytokine receptors. Most studies have looked at the receptor tyrosine kinases and examples of these are platelet derived growth factor receptor (PDGFR) pathway and epidermal growth factor receptor (EGFR).

Src contains at least three flexible protein domains, which, in conjunction with myristoylation, can mediate attachment to membranes and determine subcellular localization.

Function 

This proto-oncogene may play a role in the regulation of embryonic development and cell growth.

When src is activated, it promotes survival, angiogenesis, proliferation and invasion pathways. It also regulates angiogenic factors and vascular permeability after focal cerebral ischemia-reperfusion, and regulates matrix metalloproteinase-9 activity after intracerebral hemorrhage.

Role in cancer 
The activation of the c-Src pathway has been observed in about 50% of tumors from colon, liver, lung, breast and the pancreas. Since the activation of c-Src leads to the promotion of survival, angiogenesis, proliferation and invasion pathways, the aberrant growth of tumors in cancers is observed. A common mechanism is that there are genetic mutations that result in the increased activity or the overexpression of the c-Src leading to the constant activation of the c-Src.

Colon cancer 
The activity of c-Src has been best characterized in colon cancer. Researchers have shown that Src expression is 5 to 8 fold higher in premalignant polyps than normal mucosa. The elevated c-Src levels have also been shown to have a correlation with advanced stages of the tumor, size of tumor, and metastatic potential of tumors.

Breast cancer 
EGFR activates c-Src while EGF also increases the activity of c-Src. In addition, overexpression of c-Src increases the response of EGFR-mediated processes. So both EGFR and c-Src enhance the effects of one another. Elevated expression levels of c-Src were found in human breast cancer tissues compared to normal tissues.

Overexpression of Human Epidermal Growth Factor Receptor 2 (HER2), also known as erbB2, is correlated with a worse prognosis for breast cancer. Thus, c-Src plays a key role in the tumor progression of breast cancers.

Prostate cancer 
Members of the Src family kinases Src, Lyn and Fgr are highly expressed in malignant prostate cells compared to normal prostate cells. When the primary prostate cells are treated with KRX-123, which is an inhibitor of Lyn, the cells in vitro were reduced in proliferation, migration and invasive potential. So the use of a tyrosine kinase inhibitor is a possible way of reducing the progression of prostate cancers.

As a drug target 
A number of tyrosine kinase inhibitors that target c-Src tyrosine kinase (as well as related tyrosine kinases) have been developed for therapeutic use. One notable example is dasatinib which has been approved for the treatment of chronic myeloid leukemia (CML) and Philadelphia chromosome-positive (PH+) acute lymphocytic leukemia (ALL). Dasatinib is also in clinical trials for the use in non-Hodgkin’s lymphoma, metastatic breast cancer and prostate cancer. Other tyrosine kinase inhibitor drugs that are in clinical trials include bosutinib, bafetinib, AZD-0530, XLl-999, KX01 and XL228. HSP90 inhibitor NVP-BEP800 has been described to affect stability of Src tyrosine kinase and growth of T-cell and B-cell acute lymphoblastic leukemias.

Interactions 
Src (gene) has been shown to interact with the following signaling pathways:

Survival 
 PI3K
 Akt
 IKK
 NFkB
 Caspase 9

Angiogenesis 
 STAT3
 p38 MAPK
 VEGF
 IL-8

Proliferation 
 Shc
 Grb2/SOS
 Ras
 Raf
 MEK1 / MEK2
 Erk1/2

Motility 
 FAK
 p190Rho/GAP
 Paxillin
 p130CAS
 RhoA
 JNK
 c-jun
 MLCK
 Myosin

Additional images

References

External links
 
 
  - interactive 3D model of the structure of SRC
 Vega geneview
 Src Info with links in the Cell Migration Gateway 
 

Oncogenes
Genes mutated in mice
Tyrosine kinases